α-Hydroxyglutaric acid (2-hydroxyglutaric acid) is an alpha hydroxy acid form of glutaric acid.

In biology
In humans the compound is formed by a hydroxyacid-oxoacid transhydrogenase whereas in bacteria is formed by a 2-hydroxyglutarate synthase. The compound can be converted to α-ketoglutaric acid through the action of a 2-hydroxyglutarate dehydrogenase which, in humans, are two enzymes called D2HGDH and L2HGDH. Deficiency in either of these two enzymes lead to a disease known as 2-hydroxyglutaric aciduria.

D-2-hydroxyglutarate 
Mutations in isocitrate dehydrogenase (IDH1 and IDH2), which frequently occur in glioma and AML, produce D-2-hydroxyglutarate from alpha-ketoglutarate. D-2-hydroxyglutarate accumulates to very high concentrations which inhibits the function of enzymes that are dependent on alpha-ketoglutarate, including  histone lysine demethylases. This leads to a hypermethylated state of DNA and histones, which results in different gene expression that can activate oncogenes and inactivate tumor-suppressor genes. Studies have also shown that 2-hydroxyglutarate may be converted back to alpha-ketoglutarate either enzymatically or non-enzymatically. Further studies are required to fully understand the dynamics between 2-hydroxyglutarate and alpha-ketoglutarate.

L-2-hydroxyglutarate 
On the other hand, L-2-hydroxyglutarate is produced at high levels in low oxygen conditions, including cells of the immune system.

References

Dicarboxylic acids
Alpha hydroxy acids